Pirate's Booty is a puffed rice and corn snack food developed and produced in 1987 by Robert Ehrlich. B&G Foods acquired Robert's American Gourmet Food in June 2013.

Ehrlich would often watch people purchasing cheese puffs in a local supermarket. The snack, Ehrlich explained, did not have "any real cheese in them... most of the ingredients you couldn't even pronounce." Ehrlich then went on to found a snack brand called Vegan Rob's, which makes cheese puffs with no cheese in them.

The snack is made with corn meal, rice and cheddar cheese. 

Pirate Brands is owned and operated by Amplify Snack Brands, a Hershey company.

Product recall 
On June 29, 2007, Robert's American Gourmet recalled their Veggie Booty brand snack food due to salmonella contamination.

See also 
Cheese puffs
Cheetos
Cheez Doodles
Robert's American Gourmet

References

External links 

Pirate's Booty's Official Website

Brand name snack foods
Products introduced in 1987
American snack foods
Popcorn brands